Philippe Heilberg is a former Wall Street banker and former partner of AIG Trading Group. After leaving AIG, Heilberg created JARCH Capital, LLC. Currently, he is the Chief Operating Officer and Chief Financial Officer of Arbol Inc., the first peer-to-peer weather insurance platform.

In 2009 he invested in a major land deal in South Sudan.

References

Living people
Date of birth missing (living people)
21st-century American lawyers
New York (state) lawyers
Year of birth missing (living people)